The Rockford Foresters were a collegiate summer baseball team based in Rockford, Illinois. The team began play at Marinelli Field in downtown Rockford in 2010. The team was a member of the Midwest Collegiate League and consists of college players playing in collegiate summer ball leagues.

Team history
The Rockford Foresters, an amateur team, were formed by Owner and Team President Joe Stefani of Three Strikes Baseball and other investors including a former owner of the American Hockey League's Rockford IceHogs. The team was formally announced in November, and the team announced the team name and logo at a press conference at the Rockford Park District on January 13, 2010.

Players will be college student-athletes with remaining college eligibility and amateur status intact. Those who have signed professional contracts are ineligible to play in summer amateur leagues.

The Rockford Foresters drew 921 fans for their opener, a 3–2 win over the Chicago Zephyrs. In their first season at Marinelli Field, the Foresters won the league's Championship. In 2011, the Foresters took their team to the Championship Series, where they lost in game three against the Will County CrackerJacks.

Marinelli Field
The Foresters will play home games at Marinelli Field. The stadium was built for the Rockford Expos, a minor league baseball team affiliated with the Montreal Expos, in 1988 and later housed the Rockford Cubbies.

Marinelli Field's capacity was reduced following the RiverHawks' move into their new stadium. Marinelli now has a capacity of 2,357 with 100 Level and 200 Level seats. For the Foresters, there will be three party decks, consisting of 20, 40 and 75 person groups.

Midwest Collegiate League
The Midwest Collegiate League is an amateur league/wood bat collegiate league that was started as the Great Plains Baseball League and was rebranded as the Midwest Collegiate League in 2011. The players are all college players playing summer college ball, who play in the NCAA, NJCAA, and NAIA.

Former Wood Bat Players who have played in different leagues in Illinois include Jonathan Papelbon, Neal Cotts, Kirby Puckett, Ryan Howard, and Joe Girardi. Players that play in the Midwest Collegiate League come from a variety of colleges and universities. Over 50% of players in the Midwest Collegiate League in 2012 will be from Division I programs.

References
Sources
 Official Team Website
 Press Conference and Team Naming
 Monmouth College Article
 News on Rockford Foresters on WREX

Notes

External links
 Rockford Foresters Website

Foresters
Amateur baseball teams in Illinois
2010 establishments in Illinois
Baseball teams established in 2010